Lina Solomonovna Stern (or Shtern; ; 26 August 1878 – 7 March 1968) was a Soviet biochemist, physiologist and humanist whose medical discoveries  saved thousands of lives at the fronts of World War II. She is best known for her pioneering work on the blood–brain barrier, which she described as hemato-encephalic barrier in 1921.

Life and career
Born in Libau in the Russian Empire (today Liepāja, Latvia) into a Jewish family and educated in Geneva, Switzerland, she pursued an academic career and performed original research in biochemistry and in the neurosciences. From 1918 onwards she was the first woman awarded professional rank at the University of Geneva, being a Professor of chemio-physiology, and researching cellular oxidation.  Stern worked with Frédéric Battelli and Torsten Thunberg to demonstrate in 1912 that animal tissue contained enzymes that transferred hydrogen from organic acids to reduce and turn methylene blue colourless. In 1925 she had emigrated to the Soviet Union out of ideological convictions. From 1925 to 1948 she served as Professor of the 2nd Medical Institute.

From 1929 to 1948, Stern was Director of Institute of Physiology of the USSR Academy of Sciences. Among many problems Stern and her group worked on were longevity and sleep. Under her leadership, multidisciplinary groups of colleagues worked on the problems of the hemato-encephalic and histohematic barriers. The results of this work were later implemented in clinical practice and saved thousands of lives at the fronts of World War II. In 1939 she became the first female full member of the Academy (academician). In 1943 she won the Stalin Prize.

Research on the blood–brain barrier 
The blood–brain barrier refers to a diffusion barrier formed by the endothelial walls of the blood vessels and capillaries in the brain. This barrier prevents most substances in the blood from entering the brain while allowing small molecules like oxygen and carbon dioxide to diffuse freely. While working at the University of Geneva, Stern published a series of studies demonstrating the existence of the blood-brain barrier with colleague Raymond Gautier. Beginning in 1918, the two performed systematic experiments on the movement of various substances from the blood into the nervous system and estimated the extent to which these substances were able to permeate the brain. From these studies they were able to conclude that there exists a barrier between the blood and brain, which they termed in French "barrière hématoencéphalique". In a 1934 paper, Stern also independently introduced the notions of barrier selectivity and barrier resistance, realizing that the blood–brain barrier both selectively allows certain substances to enter the brain and protects the internal milieu of the brain from that of the blood. Today these are acknowledged as two of the main functions of the blood–brain barrier.

Activism and persecutions

A member of the Women's Anti-Fascist Committee and the Jewish Anti-Fascist Committee (JAC) since the outbreak of World War II, Stern was the sole survivor out of 15 arrested and convicted to death sentence when the JAC was eradicated in January 1949. Her death sentence was changed to a prison term, followed by five-year exile. The exile was in Dzhambul (current Taraz), Kazakhstan.

After rehabilitation

After Stalin's death, life became easier.  Finally she was exonerated by the Presidium, returned to Moscow and 1954–1968 she headed the Department of Physiology at Biophysics Institute. She often spoke of anti-Semitism denying in testimony that the Soviet Union was her "motherland".  She renounced the Bolshevik revolution putting it in the context of discrimination against Jewish people.

See also
Dmitri Bashkirov, her nephew.

References

Further reading
 Stalin's Secret Pogrom: The Postwar Inquisition of the Jewish Anti-Fascist Committee by Joshua Rubenstein.

External links
 "Shtern, Lina Solomonovna" by Yaacov Ro’i. YIVO Encyclopedia of Jews in Eastern Europe.
 Star called Lina by Irina Lukyanova (Vestnik journal) 
 Difficult Years of Lina Stern by V. B. Malkin (russcience) 
 First Woman Academic by N. A. Grigoryan (russcience) 
 Lina Solomonovna Stern (1878–1968) by R. A. Chaurina (nature.web.ru) 

1878 births
1968 deaths
Scientists from Liepāja
Emigrants from the Russian Empire to Switzerland
Swiss emigrants to the Soviet Union
Soviet Jews
Soviet inventors
Jewish chemists
Soviet biochemists
Soviet women chemists
Stalin Prize winners
Jewish anti-fascists
Full Members of the USSR Academy of Sciences
Academicians of the USSR Academy of Medical Sciences
University of Geneva alumni
Soviet physiologists
Women inventors
Women physiologists
Female anti-fascists